The Government of India Act 1919 (9 & 10 Geo. 5 c. 101) was an Act of the Parliament of the United Kingdom. It was passed to expand participation of Indians in the government of India. The Act embodied the reforms recommended in the report of the Secretary of State for India, Edwin Montagu, and the Viceroy,  Chelmsford. The Act covered ten years, from 1919 to 1929. This Act began the genesis of responsible government in India. It was set to be reviewed by the Simon Commission in 10 years. 

The Act received royal assent on 23 December 1919. On the same day the King-Emperor issued a proclamation which reviewed the course of parliamentary legislation for India and the intent of the act: 
"The Acts of 1773 and 1784 were designed to establish a regular system of administration and justice under the East India Company. The Act of 1833 opened the door for Indians to public office and employment. The Act of 1858 transferred the administration from the Company to the Crown and laid the foundations of public life which exist in India today. The Act of 1861 sowed the seed of representative institutions, and the seed was quickened into life by the Act of 1909. The Act which has now become law entrusts the elected representative of the people with a definite share in the Government and points the way to full responsible Government hereafter".

The Act provided a dual form of government (a "diarchy") for the major provinces. In each such province, control of some areas of government, the "transferred list", were given to a Government of ministers answerable to the Provincial Council. The 'transferred list ' included agriculture, supervision of local government, health, and education. The Provincial Councils were enlarged.

At the same time, all other areas of government (the 'reserved list') remained under the control of the Viceroy. The 'reserved list' included defence (the military), foreign affairs, and communications.

The Imperial Legislative Council was enlarged and reformed. It became a bicameral legislature for all India. The lower house was the Legislative Assembly of 145 members, of which 104 were elected and 41 were nominated, with a tenure of three years. The upper house was the Council of State, consisting of 34 elected and 26 nominated members, with a  tenure of five years.

Essential characteristics 
Salient features of the Act were as follows: 
 This Act had a separate Preamble which declared that the objective of the British Government was the gradual introduction of responsible government in India.
Diarchy was introduced at the Provincial Level.  Diarchy means a dual set of governments; one is accountable, the other is not accountable. Subjects of the provincial government were divided into two groups. One group was reserved, and the other group was transferred. The reserved subjects were controlled by the British Governor of the province; the transferred subjects were given to the Indian ministers of the province.
The Government of India Act of 1919, made a provision for classification of the central and provincial subjects. The Act kept the Income Tax as a source of revenue to the Central Government. However, for Bengal and Bombay, to meet their objections, a provision to assign them 25% of the income tax was made. 
No bill of the legislature could be deemed to have been passed unless assented to by the Viceroy. The latter could, however, enact a bill without the assent of the legislature.
This Act made the central legislature bicameral. The lower house was the Legislative Assembly, with 145 members serving three-year terms (the model for today's Lok Sabha); the upper house was the Council of States with 60 members serving five-year terms (the model for today's Rajya Sabha)
The Act provided for the establishment of a Public Service Commission in India for the first time. 
This act also made a provision that a statutory commission would be set up at the end of 10 years after the act was passed which shall inquire into the working system of the government. The Simon commission of 1927 was an outcome of this provision.
The communal representation was extended and Sikhs, Europeans and Anglo-Indians were included. The Franchise (Right of voting) was granted to the limited number of only those who paid a certain minimum "Tax" to the government. 
The seats were distributed among the provinces not upon the basis of the population but upon the basis of their importance in the eyes of the government, on the basis of communities, and the property was one of the main basis to determine a franchisee. Those people who had property, taxable income & paid land revenue of Rs. 3000 were entitled to vote.
The financial powers of the central legislature were also very much limited. The budget was to be divided into two categories, votable and non-votable. The votable items covered only one-third of the total expenditure. Even in this sphere, the Governor-General was empowered to restore any grant refused or reduced by the legislature if in his opinion the demand was essential for the discharge of his responsibilities. Thus the Government of India Act provided for partial transfer of power to the electorate through the system of diarchy. It also prepared the ground for Indian federalism, as it identified the provinces as units of fiscal and general administration.

The Indian National Congress rejected the Act, however some leaders such as Annie Besant, G. S. Khaparde, Bipin Chandra Pal, Surendranath Banerjee, and Tej Bahadur Sapru accepted the Act and were ready to cooperate with the government. They left the Congress. Surendranath Banerjee and Tej Bahadur Sapru formed Indian Liberal Federation and were normally referred as "Liberals". Madan Mohan Malaviya supported the reforms and Muhammad Ali Jinnah resigned from Indian National Congress.

See also
British India
British Raj
History of Bangladesh
History of India
History of Pakistan
Governor-General of India
Government of India Act (disambiguation)
India Office
Montagu–Chelmsford Reforms
Secretary of State for India

References

External links 

British Empire
1919 in law
United Kingdom Acts of Parliament 1919
1919 in India
Imperial Legislative Council of India
1919 in international relations
Acts of the Parliament of the United Kingdom concerning India
December 1919 events